Afua or Efua is an Akan day name traditionally given to girls born on a Friday; the equivalent male name is Kofi.

Given name or day name 
 Afua Adwo Jectey Hesse, Ghanaian pædiatric surgeon and former president of the Medical Women's International Association
 Afua Bruce, American engineer, data executive, professor, and politician
 Afua Cooper (born 1957), Canadian historian and dub poet, born in Jamaica
 Afua Hirsch (born 1981), British writer, broadcaster, and former barrister, born in Norway
 Afua Kobi (fl. 1834–1884),  of the Ashanti Empire
 Afua Kuma (1908–1987), Ghanaian oral theologian
 Afua Osei, American entrepreneur and public speaker, co-founder of She Leads Africa
 Afua Richardson (born 1980), African–Native American comic book artist
 Efua Asibon, Ghanaian businesswoman
 Efua Baker (born c. 1967), British singer-songwriter and celebrity fitness expert, born in Ghana
 Efua Dorkenoo (1949–2014), affectionately known as "Mama Efua", Ghanaian-British campaigner against female genital mutilation
 Efua Sutherland (1924–1996), Ghanaian playwright, director, dramatist, children's author, poet, educationalist, researcher, child advocate, and cultural activist
 Efua Traoré, Nigerian-German writer

See also 
 Afuʻalo Matoto, Tongan political figure and life peer
 Afuang: Bounty Hunter, 1988 Philippine biographical action film
 Charles Afuakwah (born 1966), Scottish former rugby union player born in Ghana

Feminine given names